Alex Clare-Young is a transmasculine non-binary Minister of the United Reformed Church in the United Kingdom. They minister mainly to an online church (Churspacious), and offer education and advocacy to schools, churches and Christian communities on issues relating to gender identity.

Personal life
Clare-Young received an MPhil degree from the University of Cambridge, and while there was a member of the Student Christian Movement. They are married to Revd. Jo Clare-Young, and live with her in Scarborough.

Clare-Young appeared on Songs of Praise to discuss their gender identity in April 2020.

Clare-Young is conducting doctoral research at the University of Birmingham, funded by the Council for World Mission.

Activism
Clare-Young is a member of the Iona Community and was formerly Community Leader of Peter's House. Clare-Young is moderator of the Iona Community's LGBTQ+ Common Concern Network.

Clare-Young has supplied written evidence in response to the British government's consultation with the trans community on amending the Gender Recognition Act 2004 to remove fees for trans people obtaining Gender Recognition Certificates, and favours removing a required medical diagnosis of gender dysphoria from the Act.

In 2019, Clare-Young authored the book Transgender. Christian. Human.

Since 2021, Clare-Young is co-chair of trustees of the Open Table Network, an ecumenical Christian community for LGBT people and their allies. Clare-Young is also a consultant for OneBodyOneFaith and Creating Sanctuary.

Living in Love and Faith
Alex and Jo Clare-Young appeared in a video clip for Living in Love and Faith, a group which calls for better relationships between the Church of England and the LGBT community. Clare-Young said in the video: "I do expect people to respect me but I don’t expect people to know what to do with me. Some people might never have met a trans person before." Ben John of the conservative evangelical group Christian Concern criticised the video, continuously misgendering Clare-Young and saying that "transgenderism is a false ideology", "what we're actually seeing here is a lesbian couple. This man isn't really a man. She's a woman." In response, Clare-Young called for John to re-edit his video and remove personal remarks, saying that the comments "were leading to personal harm to myself, my wife, and the others in the video. ... It describes me and my wife as being in a same-sex marriage, which isn't true." The North Yorkshire Police investigated the comments as a potential hate crime.

Clare-Young was in the co-ordinating group for Living in Love and Faith, recruited by the Bishop of Coventry, Christopher Cocksworth. Church Times quoted Clare-Young as writing: "I want to stress that same-sex marriage is not the only thing required for LGBTQ+ equity and justice in the Church. Many churches and many Christians, in many denominations, still treat LGBTQ+ people in horrific ways, and spiritual abuse of LGBTQ+ people is still horrifically common."

Writing in the journal Theology and Sexuality, Clare-Young examines unequal power dynamics and personalized arguments deployed by Christian Concern during the Living in Love and Faith process, and argues for a "paradigmatic shift" regarding LGBTQ+ people.

Notes and references

External links
 Alex Clare-Young

Living people
Year of birth missing (living people)
English LGBT people
21st-century LGBT people
LGBT Protestant clergy
United Reformed Church ministers
British Protestant ministers and clergy
Transgender non-binary people